, also known as Terra Diver, is a vertical-scrolling shooting game by Raizing originally released as an arcade game for the ST-V platform in 1996. The game was ported to the Sega Saturn and PlayStation in 1997, with neither port being released outside of Japan.

Gameplay
Soukyugurentai is a vertical-scrolling shooter.  The player picks one of three different ships - red, green or blue - each with their own pilot, fire pattern and laser web. Each ship has a standard gun and a bomb, but the most distinctive of these aspects is the laser-web: holding down the button for the standard gun will release a lock-on laser-web traditionally shaped as a cone or semicircle, which will destroy the enemies it locks onto after releasing the buttons. Each ship has two different lock-on weapons that function as web-designed laser targets. Once an enemy enters the web's range, the player can destroy the enemy or multiple enemies can be destroyed via homing lasers or multiple fireballs. The game is unusual in that, rather than using a 3:4 aspect ratio, to better suit the vertically oriented gameplay, it uses a horizontal monitor (4:3) in the style of Neo Geo vertical shooters as well as the later Radiant Silvergun and Giga Wing.

Plot
After exhausting the Earth's resources, particularly fossil fuel, innumerable trade companies team up with NASA and begin initiating space programs dedicated to finding resources outside the planet. Mining facilities are established in different areas outside of Earth, particularly on large asteroids near the Moon and most especially on Mars. Various resources are found from these areas and distributed to Earth which aid in the world economy. The largest company that is established from this is the Jin-Sei (Exhausting Star) Corporation set in Japan which is worth 1 trillion in New Yen investments, founded by the Miama family.

However, after years of space resource distribution, the separate companies started initiating attacks that would dominate other company's resources. The strongest of these attacks started on Martian colonies established by the second largest company on Earth, Eight Luck Interstellar Development Inc., which banded with smaller companies across Earth including ones in China, England, and America. Eight Luck planned on claiming Mars for its own so as to monopolize on the outsourcing of minerals as well as developing terraformed areas.

In response to these attacks, the Jin-Sei formed a union with the JDF (a future version of the JSDF) and began working on a space fighter program organized by Defensive Section 2 of the JDF known as the Soukyugurentai (SOQ for short), which utilized a unique laser technology fighting system known as NALS (Non-blind spot All range Laser System) in combat. The threat of eco-terrorism was on the rise as outspoken ecosystem protectionism groups opposed the company's outsourcing of materials; these were used as subsequent cover-up stories to hide the company war waging between Jin-Sei and Eight Luck from public awareness. Made up of the best fighters adapted to this combat system as well as innumerable stamina strengthening tests for space travel, the SOQ are sent in to defend company territory from rival companies on Earth and space at all costs.

Releases
Soukyu Gurentai was first distributed for the arcades in Japan in September 1996. The game was released as a cartridge kit for Sega's ST-V arcade system board. While the game was never widely distributed outside Japan, inserting the cartridge on a foreign ST-V board will set the in-game language to English and change the title to Terra Diver (both titles are printed on the cartridge's label).

A Sega Saturn version was released by Electronic Arts in February 1997, five months after the arcade release. Because the original arcade hardware was directly based on the Sega Saturn architecture, this is a close conversion of the original game. Several options and features were also added, including a practice mode which allows the player to try out any of the game's stages without going through the entire campaign, as well as support for the Multi Controller and Mission Stick. A bargain-priced version was released in December 1997, titled , which includes a demo for the Saturn version of Battle Garegga.

A PlayStation version was also released by Data East in December 1997 titled . This version features a Special Mode which adds a fourth playable ship and a new final stage, as well as animated opening and ending videos and a voiced navigator. It supports the analog controls of the DualShock controller. The PlayStation version was reissued in May 2003 by Hamster as part of their MajorWave budget label.

Soukyu Gurentai was ported to Japanese feature phones in 2005 and was available for EZWeb, i-mode and Yahoo! Keitai devices.

Reception
In Japan, Game Machine listed Terra Diver on their October 15, 1996 issue as being the fifth most popular arcade software for that two-week period among operators surveyed. Sōkyū Gurentai was one of Raizing's most popular arcade games. Consoles + rated the Sega Saturn version at 92%.

Next Generation reviewed the Saturn version of the game, rating it three stars out of five, and stated that "Good, mindless fun, but not much else. For Saturn owners who lament Raystorm'''s absence, Soukyu Gurentai'' is a great, possibly even better, alternative."

Notes

References

External links
Eighting arcade page 
Eighting mobile page 
Hamster page 
Data East page 

Terra Diver at the World of Arcades

1996 video games
Arcade video games
Cooperative video games
Eco-terrorism in fiction
Eighting games
Electronic Arts games
Hamster Corporation games
Japan-exclusive video games
Mobile games
Multiplayer and single-player video games
PlayStation (console) games
Science fiction video games
Sega Saturn games
Victor Entertainment games
Video games about terrorism
Video games developed in Japan
Video games featuring female protagonists
Video games scored by Hitoshi Sakimoto
Video games set in the future
Video games set in Tokyo
Video games set on Mars